Greenhill Stadium（グリーンヒル・スタジアム）is a baseball stadium in Katō, Hyōgo, Japan.It is currently used mostly for baseball and softball matches. The stadium was built in 1992.

References

External links
 www.city.kato.lg.jp/institution/sports.html

Baseball venues in Japan
Sports venues in Hyōgo Prefecture
Sports venues completed in 1992
1992 establishments in Japan
Katō, Hyōgo